Jean-Baptiste du Plessis d'Argentré  (1 November 1720 – 24 February 1805) was Bishop of Séez, Normandy, from 17 Sep 1775 until his death.

Jean-Baptiste was born in the Château de Plessis in Argentré-du-Plessis in Brittany, from where the family took their name, to Pierre, former page of Louis XIV, and Marie-Louise Hindret de Ravenne.

He was tutor to the Enfants de France, the children of the French royal family, and the King's almoner. He was also (commendatory) abbot of the abbeys of Olivet (1749), Saint-Germain d'Auxerre (1761), Silly-en-Gouffern (1776) and Saint-Aubin, Angers (1781).

References

Bishops of Séez
1720 births
1805 deaths